Centrorhynchus may refer to:
 Centrorhynchus (worm), a genus of parasitic worms in the family Centrorhynchidae
 Centrorhynchus, a fossil genus of brachiopods in the family Trigonirhynchiidae, synonym of Sartenaerus
 Centrorhynchus, a genus of weevils in the family Curculionidae, synonym of Ceutorhynchus